Serenoa repens, commonly known as saw palmetto, is the sole species currently classified in the genus Serenoa. It is endemic to the subtropical and tropical Southeastern United States, most commonly along the south Atlantic and Gulf Coastal plains and sand hills. It grows in clumps or dense thickets in sandy coastal areas, and as undergrowth in pine woods or hardwood hammocks.

Description
Erect stems or trunks are rarely produced, but are found in some populations. It is a hardy plant; extremely slow-growing, and long-lived, with some plants (especially in Florida) possibly being as old as 500–700 years.

Saw palmetto is a fan palm, with the leaves that have a bare petiole terminating in a rounded fan of about 20 leaflets. The petiole is armed with fine, sharp teeth or spines that give the species its common name. The teeth or spines are easily capable of breaking the skin, and protection should be worn when working around a saw palmetto. The leaves are light green inland, and silvery-white in coastal regions. The leaves are 1–2 m in length, the leaflets 50–100 cm long. They are similar to the leaves of the palmettos of genus Sabal. The flowers are yellowish-white, about 5 mm across, produced in dense compound panicles up to 60 cm long.

The fruit is a large reddish-black drupe and is an important food source for wildlife and historically for humans. The plant is used as a food plant by the larvae of some Lepidoptera species such as Batrachedra decoctor, which feeds exclusively on the plant.

The generic name honors American botanist Sereno Watson.

Medical research

Saw palmetto extract has been studied as a possible treatment for people with prostate cancer and for men with lower urinary tract  symptoms associated with benign prostatic hyperplasia (BPH). As of 2018, there is insufficient scientific evidence that saw palmetto extract is effective for treating cancer or BPH and its symptoms.

One 2016 review of clinical studies with a standardized extract of saw palmetto (called Permixon) found that the extract was safe and may be effective for relieving BPH-induced urinary symptoms compared against a placebo.

Ethnobotany
Indigenous names are reported to include: tala or  talimushi ("palmetto's uncle") in Choctaw; cani (Timucua); ta ́:la (Koasati); taalachoba ("big palm", Alabama); ta:laɬ a ́ kko ("big palm", Creek); talco ́:bˆı ("big palm", Mikasuki); and guana (Taino, possibly). Saw palmetto fibers have been found among materials from indigenous people as far north as Wisconsin and New York, strongly suggesting this material was widely traded prior to European contact. The leaves are used for thatching by several indigenous groups, so commonly that a location in Alachua County, Florida, is named Kanapaha ("palm house"). The fruit may have been used to treat an unclear form of fish poisoning by the Seminoles and Bahamians.

References

External links

Serenoa repens
Serenoa repens from Floridata
Interactive Distribution Map for Serenoa repens 

Coryphoideae
Monotypic Arecaceae genera
Plants used in traditional Native American medicine
Flora of the Southeastern United States
Flora of Florida
Non-timber forest products